Smilodonterpeton is an extinct genus of procolophonid from the Late Triassic of the United Kingdom. It contains a single species, Smilodonterpeton ruthinensis.

References 

Procolophonids
Prehistoric reptile genera